Ivan Khomutov (born March 11, 1985) is a Russian former professional ice hockey forward. He was selected by New Jersey Devils in the 8th round (242nd overall) of the 2002 NHL Entry Draft.

Prior to returning to Russia to join HC CSKA Moscow of the KHL for the 2008–09 KHL season, Khomutov had played 201 games in the American Hockey League with the Albany River Rats and Lowell Devils.

Career statistics

References 

1985 births
Living people
Albany River Rats players
Avtomobilist Yekaterinburg players
HC Berkut-Kyiv players
HC CSKA Moscow players
Dunaújvárosi Acélbikák players
Kompanion Kiev players
HC Lada Togliatti players
London Knights players
Lowell Devils players
Molot-Prikamye Perm players
New Jersey Devils draft picks
Russian ice hockey centres
Trenton Titans players